Koba Leïn Koindredi (born 27 October 2001) is a French professional footballer who plays as a central midfielder for Spanish club Real Oviedo, on loan from Valencia CF.

Early life
Koindredi was born in Djibouti to a New Caledonian military father who was on a peacekeeping mission in the East African country; his grandfather from Païta fought for France in World War I. He grew up in Fréjus, in the Var department.

Club career
Koindredi joined RC Lens' youth setup in 2017, from Étoile Fréjus Saint-Raphaël. He made his senior debut with the former's reserves on 22 December 2018, aged 17, by playing the last 30 minutes of a 0–1 Championnat National 2 home loss against SC Schiltigheim.

In January 2019, Koindredi moved to Valencia CF, being initially assigned to the Juvenil A squad. Promoted to the B-team in Segunda División B for the 2019–20 campaign, he scored his first senior goal on 1 September, netting the opener of a 2–2 away draw against CD Castellón. During the season, he also featured with the Juvenil squad in the UEFA Youth League.

Koindredi made his first team debut on 16 December 2020, starting in a 4–2 away win against Terrassa FC for the season's Copa del Rey. He made his La Liga debut fourteen days later, coming on as a late substitute for Vicente Esquerdo in a 1–2 away loss against Granada CF. He scored his first goal for the first team on 17 January 2021 in the last 32 of the cup, opening a 2–0 win at AD Alcorcón.

On 30 May 2021, after Valencia's reserves were demoted to the fifth-tier Tercera División RFEF following a restructuring, Koindredi extended his contract with the club until June 2025. In their run to the cup final that season, he scored a direct free kick to wrap up a 3–0 win at amateur side CD Utrillas in the first round on 2 December.

On 25 August 2022, Koindredi moved on loan to Segunda División side Real Oviedo for the season.

Career statistics

Club

References

External links

2001 births
Living people
French footballers
Djiboutian footballers
People from Djibouti (city)
Sportspeople from Fréjus
Association football midfielders
RC Lens players
Valencia CF Mestalla footballers
Valencia CF players
Real Oviedo players
Championnat National 2 players
La Liga players
Segunda División B players
French expatriate footballers
Expatriate footballers in Spain
French expatriate sportspeople in Spain
French people of New Caledonian descent
Djiboutian people of French descent
Footballers from Provence-Alpes-Côte d'Azur
France youth international footballers